Igor Angelkorte (born August 10, 1983) is a Brazilian actor, author and director.

Career 
He graduated in theater and made his television debut in Rede Globo novel: Além do Horizonte, a telenovela screened in 2014. Before that, he had only made a brief participation in Araguaia. In 2015, he got a part in the soap opera Babylon, in prime time on TV Globo, after making a participation in the series Dupla Identidade. He is formed by Casa das Artes de Laranjeiras.

Filmography

Television

Film

Stage

References

External links

1983 births
Living people
Male actors from Rio de Janeiro (city)
Brazilian male television actors
Brazilian male film actors
Brazilian male stage actors